Illinois Route 157 (IL 157) is a  north–south state highway in the southwestern part of the U.S. state of Illinois. The southern terminus of the highway is at an intersection with IL 3 in Cahokia. The northern terminus of the highway is at an intersection with IL 140 in Hamel.

Route description 

IL 157 travels concurrent with IL 13 and IL 163 in Centreville and IL 159 and IL 143 in Edwardsville. IL 157 is the major north–south road through the busiest towns in Madison County – Collinsville and Edwardsville.

The segment of the highway within the villages of Cahokia and Centreville from IL 3 to IL 13 is known as Camp Jackson Road.

The segment of the highway north from IL 13 to approximately Interstate 270 (I-270) is known as Bluff Road, because it roughly follows the eastern bluffs of the Mississippi River which define the American Bottoms in Madison and St. Clair counties.

History 
State Bond Issue Route (SBI) Route 157 originally traveled from Cahokia to Glen Carbon. It was then extended to the Missouri state line at the Jefferson Barracks Bridge in 1946; this was undone by 1958. In 1965, the northern terminus was moved to Hamel, replacing U.S. Route 66 Bypass (US 66 Byp.), which itself was the US 66 mainline prior to 1957.

Major intersections

See also 

 List of state routes in Illinois

References

External links

157
Transportation in St. Clair County, Illinois
Transportation in Madison County, Illinois
Edwardsville, Illinois
U.S. Route 66 in Illinois